Hwang Hyeon-jun (born March 21, 1997 in Goyang) is a South Korean male curler and curling coach from Gyeonggi Province

Teams

Record as a coach of national teams

Personal life
He started curling in 2004 at the age of 8.

References

External links

Video: 

Living people
1997 births
People from Goyang
Sportspeople from Gyeonggi Province
South Korean male curlers

Competitors at the 2019 Winter Universiade
South Korean curling coaches
21st-century South Korean people